Thomas Gisborne (31 October 1758 – 24 March 1846) was an English Anglican priest and poet. He was a member of the Clapham Sect, who fought for the abolition of the slave trade in England.

Life
Gisborne was born at Bridge Gate, Derby, the son of John Gisborne of Yoxhall Lodge in Needwood Forest, Staffordshire and his wife Anne Bateman. He was educated at Harrow and entered St John's College, Cambridge in 1776, where he established lifelong friendships with William Wilberforce and Thomas Babington. At Cambridge, he became the first Chancellor's medallist in 1780.

In 1783 he became curate of Barton-under-Needwood, and later that year inherited Yoxall Lodge, Staffordshire, which was 3 miles from the church. The next year he married Mary Babington (b. 1760), only sister of Thomas Babington. They had six sons and two daughters. The eldest son, Thomas Gisborne (1794–1852), became a member of parliament, and the fourth son, James, a clergyman, succeeded his father as perpetual curate of Barton in 1820.

Gisborne was a central figure in the Clapham Sect, an abolitionist group which included William Wilberforce and Gisborne's brother-in-law Thomas Babington. Yoxall Lodge acted as a major focus of the group, and Wilberforce was a frequent visitor there.

Gisborne was appointed prebendary of Durham Cathedral in 1823. He died at Yoxall Lodge on 24 March 1846 at the age of eighty-seven. Gisborne left money for an annual scholarship at the University of Durham, which is referred to as the Gisborne Scholarship.

Writing

Gisborne's Principles of Moral Philosophy (1789) was a forceful evangelical attack on William Paley's Principles of Moral and Political Philosophy (1785), an influential work studied at both Cambridge and Oxford Universities, arguing morality as a categorical imperative against Paley's utilitarian standpoint. Gisborne also wrote Enquiry into the Duties of Men (1795) and Enquiry into the Duties of the Female Sex (1797) stressing subordination to the divinely imposed social hierarchy. His Walks in a Forest (1794) was a book of poems describing the scenery of Needwood Forest, which bordered his estate at Yoxall.

Scriptural geologist
A scriptural geologist, Gisborne wrote two books which criticised the trend of geology away from a basis in the Bible: Testimony of Natural Theology to Christianity (1818) and Considerations on Modern Theories of Geology (1837).

Published works

Principles of Moral Philosophy (1789)
Remarks Respecting the Abolition of the Slave Trade (1792)
Walks in a Forest (1794)
An Enquiry into the Duties of Men in the Higher and Middle Classes of Society" in Great Britain (1794)
An Enquiry into the Duties of the Female Sex (1797)
Poems Sacred and Moral (1798)
A Selection of Psalms and Hymns for Public and Private Use, with Jonathan Stubbs (1805)
Sermons Volume 1 (1809)
A Familiar Survey of the Christian Religion and of History (1810)
Testimony of Natural Theology to Christianity (1818)
Essays on Recollection of Friends in a Future State (1822)
Considerations on Modern Theories of Geology (1837)

Hymns
A Soldier's Course from Battles Won
Hark! 'Tis the Bell with Solemn Toll
O Father, Glorify Thy Name
Saviour, When Night Involves the Skies
Thy Humblest Works with Full Accord
When Groves by Moonlight Silence Keep

Footnotes

References

 
 

1758 births
1846 deaths
People educated at Harrow School
Alumni of St John's College, Cambridge
English philosophers
Evangelical Anglican clergy
Clapham Sect
People from Derby
Paintings by Joseph Wright of Derby
Anglican poets
People from Yoxall